Seven Hearths is a historic plantation house located near Tryon, Polk County, North Carolina.  It was built about 1800 for Marvel (Marville) Mills - assumed built by his father Major William Mills, and is a two-story, five bay, Federal style frame dwelling.  It has exterior gable end double shouldered chimneys and flanking one bay wide, one bay deep projections.

It was added to the National Register of Historic Places in 1976.

References

Plantation houses in North Carolina
Houses on the National Register of Historic Places in North Carolina
Federal architecture in North Carolina
Houses completed in 1800
Houses in Polk County, North Carolina
National Register of Historic Places in Polk County, North Carolina